Crumpsall is an outer suburb and electoral ward of Manchester, England,  north of Manchester city centre, bordered by Cheetham Hill, Blackley, Harpurhey, Broughton, and Prestwich. The population at the 2011 census was 15,959. Historically part of Lancashire, Crumpsall was a township within the parish of Manchester, Salford Hundred. North Manchester General Hospital is in Crumpsall.

History

The name Crumpsall derives from old English and means a "crooked piece of land beside a river". It is first mentioned in 1291. In 1472, Crumpsall was held in socage by James Radcliffe subject to an annual rent of ten shillings. It later passed to the family of Edward Coke who held it until 1789 when it was divided. One part was sold to Thomas Egerton, 1st Earl of Wilton and another, 188 acres, to William Marsden of Liverpool.  Marsden's portion was divided into three farms: Boardman's Tenement, Pendleton Tenement and Oldham's Tenement and a dyeworks known as Holland's Tenement. Oldham's Tenement, 45 acres, was sold to the Guardians of the Poor of Manchester in 1855 as a site for the new workhouse, later known as Springfield Hospital.  Pendleton Tenement was bought by the Delaunay family and later sold to the Prestwich Poor law union as the site for a workhouse.

Crumpsall was rural in character during the early part of the 19th century, however, the necessity to house Manchester's growing population of mill workers saw the area become more urbanised. Crumpsall was incorporated into the city of Manchester in 1890.

Crumpsall Hall was the seat of the Chethams and subsequently passed to the Waklyns. The Manchester workhouse was built after the formation of the Poor Law Unions in 1837.

The Co-operative Wholesale Society opened the Crumpsall Biscuit Works in Lower Crumpsall around 1873.

Crumpsall is the location of North Manchester General Hospital. This was previously three hospitals: Crumpsall Hospital (a general hospital), Springfield Hospital (a psychiatric hospital) and Delaunay's Hospital (a geriatric hospital).

In January 2003 Detective Constable Stephen Oake, a Greater Manchester Police officer, was fatally stabbed whilst arresting a suspected terrorist in a house on Crumpsall Lane.

Governance

Crumpsall was a township or civil parish in the Salford Hundred in the historic county of Lancashire. It was part of the Manchester Poor Law Union (PLU) between 1841 and 1850, the Prestwich PLU from 1850 to 1915, and again in the Manchester PLU from 1915 to 1930. In 1854 a Local Board of Health was established for the area of the township. In 1890 the township was incorporated into the city of Manchester.

Councillors

Crumpsall is represented on Manchester City Council by two Labour Councillors, Fiaz Riasat and Nasrin Ali, with a further seat vacant following the resignation of former leader of the council Richard Leese on 4 January 2022.

 indicates seat up for re-election.

Parliament 
Crumpsall is part of the Blackley and Broughton parliamentary constituency (formerly Manchester Blackley), and has been represented since 1997 by Labour Member of Parliament (MP) Graham Stringer.

Geography

Crumpsall is divided into Higher and Lower Crumpsall. Lower Crumpsall is situated in the Irk Valley, which forms its northern boundary with the neighbouring suburb of Blackley at Tetlow Bridge.

The main routes through the district are Crescent Road, Cravenwood Road, Delaunay's Road, Cleveland Road, Crumpsall Lane, Middleton Road, Lansdowne Road (the main shopping area with the post office), one half of Bury Old Road between Melton Road and Woodlands Road (the other side of the road being in the Kersal ward of Salford) and Ash Tree Road (bounded on the east side by Crumpsall Park).

Demography

According to the 2001 national census, the ward has a population of 11,363, and religious affiliation was the following:

Christian – 52.05%
Muslim – 17.26%
Jewish – 8.99%
Sikh – 1.00%
No religion or other (including Buddhist and Hindu) – 20.47%

Religion

St Thomas's Church was founded in 1863 and after the closure of St Mark's in Cheetham in 1982 its dedication was changed to St Thomas with St. Mark.  There is a war memorial in the churchyard commemorating those who died in the First World War.

In Higher Crumpsall, there are several places of worship including St Anne's Catholic Church, Crumpsall Methodist Church, St Matthew with St Mary CofE Church and Heaton Park Hebrew Congregation Synagogue.

Education
Primary education is provided by Bowker Vale Primary School, Cravenwood Primary Academy, Crumpsall Lane Primary School, King David Infant School, King David Junior School, St Anne's RC Primary School and St Thomas Primary School. Secondary education is provided by King David High School. King David Infant School, King David Junior School and King David High School are targeted at Greater Manchester's Orthodox Jewish community, whilst St Anne's RC Primary School is a Roman Catholic institution.

Crumpsall Lane Primary School is a two form entry school with two reception classes and a nursery. The head teacher is Sally Barrett.

The Abraham Moss Leisure Centre, which is near Abraham Moss Community School, hosts the only college in the area and forms part of the Manchester College network of further education institutions. It was previously part of the network of City College Manchester colleges, before the merger with MANCAT on the 1 August 2008.

Transport

Crumpsall is currently served by three stations on Manchester Metrolink's Bury line. Crumpsall Metrolink station on Station Road is located in the centre of the ward, whilst Bowker Vale station lies to the north eastern extremity on Middleton Road and borders Higher Blackley and Prestwich. The newest station stop is at Abraham Moss next to the Abraham Moss Leisure Centre, Library, Schools and a campus of Manchester College.

First Greater Manchester, Bluebird and JPT amongst other private companies operate regular bus services through the ward, via North Manchester General Hospital and onwards to Manchester city centre and other areas of Greater Manchester.

Voluntary organisations 
The Friends of Crumpsall Park oversee the development and well-being of the park in conjunction with the city council, Manchester Leisure and the police. They also organise the annual Crumpsall Carnival which takes place on the last Sunday in June.

Notable people

Sir Humphrey Chetham was born in Crumpsall in 1580, the son of a successful Manchester merchant who lived in Crumpsall Hall. He was responsible for the creation of Chetham's Hospital (now Chetham's School of Music) and Chetham's Library, the oldest public library in the English-speaking world, which is located in the city centre.

The folk singer, comedian and broadcaster Mike Harding, was born in the area in 1944.

Frontman for the pop band Freddie and the Dreamers, singer Freddie Garrity, was born in Crumpsall in 1936.

The Moors murderer Myra Hindley was born in Crumpsall in 1942.

Howard Jacobson was brought up in Crumpsall and some of his novels, Kalooki Nights and The Mighty Walzer feature descriptions of Jewish life in the area.

Actor and singer Don Estelle (Gunner "Lofty" Sugden in It Ain't Half Hot Mum), real name Ronald Edwards, was born and raised in Crumpsall.

Bassist Gary Manny "Mani" Mounfield of the Stone Roses was born in Crumpsall.

Jason Orange of the boy band Take That was born at North Manchester General Hospital in Crumpsall.

English grime artist Aaron Davis, stage name Bugzy Malone was born in Crumpsall.

Akinwale Arobieke known as Purple Aki, an English convicted criminal was born in Crumpsall.

David J. Threlfall best known for playing Frank Gallagher in the Channel 4 series Shameless.

Jeff Hordley best known for playing Cain Dingle in Emmerdale was born in Crumpsall

See also

Listed buildings in Manchester-M8

References

Areas of Manchester
Manchester City Council Wards